Lonchocarpus cyanescens is a species of shrub from family Fabaceae. It is commonly known as elu in Yoruba, anunu by Igbo people as talaki in Hausa, sauru in Tiv and as ebelu by the Edo people

It is a traditional source of indigo in West Africa to dye fabric.

References

External links
 

Plants described in 1856
cyanescens
Flora of Nigeria
Plant dyes